Krishna Chaitanya is an Indian lyricist, writer and director. He mainly works as a lyricist for the Telugu films.

Career
Krishna Chaitanya debuted with writing songs for Sambhavami yuge yuge but his first big break came with the film Yuvatha in which he penned all the songs. In his career, the lyrics he penned for the songs in the movies Ishq and Gunde Jari Gallantayyinde bought critical acclaim.

Krishna Chaitanya made his directorial debut in the film Rowdy Fellow starring Nara Rohit and Vishakha Singh, which released on 21 November 2014 with positive reviews.

Personal life
Krishna Chaitanya was born on 2 May 1983 in Eluru, Andhra Pradesh. He received his early education from CRR Public School. He studied ECE (2009) at Sri Sai Ram Engineering College, in West Tambaram.

Filmography

As lyricist

As director

References

External links
 

Telugu-language lyricists
Living people
1983 births
People from Eluru
Telugu screenwriters
Screenwriters from Andhra Pradesh
Film directors from Andhra Pradesh
Telugu film directors
People from West Godavari district